Kapālama station is a planned Honolulu Rail Transit station in Honolulu, Hawaii. It is part of the fourth HART segment, scheduled to open in 2031.

The Hawaiian Station Name Working Group proposed Hawaiian names for the twelve rail stations on the eastern end of the rail system (stations in the Airport and City Center segments) in April 2019. The proposed name for this station, Niuhelewai, means "coconut going or carried on water" and refers to a sacred residence of the goddess Haumea, the site of a battle between Haumea and Kaulu, and also the site of a battle between warriors from Oʻahu and Maui.

References

External links
 

Honolulu Rail Transit stations
Railway stations scheduled to open in 2031